The Whole Building Design Guide or WBDG is guidance in the United States, described by the Federal Energy Management Program as "a complete internet resource to a wide range of building-related design guidance, criteria and technology", and meets the requirements in guidance documents for Executive Order 13123.  The WBDG is based on the premise that to create a successful high-performance building, one must apply an integrated design and team approach in all phases of a project, including  planning, design, construction, operations and maintenance. The WBDG is managed by the National Institute of Building Sciences.

History
The WBDG was initially designed to serve U.S. Department of Defense (DOD) construction programs. A 2003 DOD memorandum named WBDG the “sole portal to design and construction criteria produced by the U.S. Army Corps of Engineers (USACE), Naval Facilities Engineering Command (NAVFAC), and U.S. Air Force.” Since then, WBDG has expanded to serve all building industry professionals. The majority of its 500,000 monthly users are from the private sector.
The WBDG draws information from the Construction Criteria Base and a privately owned database run by Information Handling Services.

A significant amount of the Whole Building Design Guide content is organized by three  categories: Design Guidance, Project Management, and Operations and Maintenance. It is structured to provide WBDG visitors first a broad understanding then increasingly specific information more targeted towards building industry professionals. The WBDG is the resource that federal agencies look to for policy and technical guidance on Federal High Performance and Sustainable Buildings In addition, the WBDG contains online tools, the original Construction Criteria Base, Building Information Modeling guides and libraries, a database of select case studies, federal mandates and other resources. The WBDG also provides over 70 online continuing education courses for architects and other building professionals, free of charge.

Development
Development of the WBDG is a collaborative effort among federal agencies, private sector companies, non-profit organizations and educational institutions.
The WBDG web site maintained by the National Institute of Building Sciences through funding support from the DOD, the NAVFAC Engineering Innovation and Criteria Office, U.S. Army Corps of Engineers, the U.S. Air Force, the U.S. General Services Administration (GSA), the U.S. Department of Veterans Affairs, the National Aeronautics and Space Administration (NASA), and the U.S. Department of Energy (DOE), and the assistance of the Sustainable Buildings Industry Council (SBIC). A Board of Direction and an Advisory Committee consisting of representatives from over 25 participating federal agencies guide the development of the WBDG.

References

External links
Whole Building Design Guide
National Institute of Building Sciences

Building engineering
Building technology
Architecture websites
Online databases
Web portals
Building information modeling